Diamonds for Breakfast is a 1968 British comedy film directed by Christopher Morahan. The film opened in London but was never released in the US. It recorded an overall loss of $1,445,000.

Cast
 Marcello Mastroianni as Grand Duke Nikolay Vladimirovich Godunov
 Rita Tushingham as Bridget Rafferty
 Elaine Taylor as Victoria
 Margaret Blye as Honey
 Francesca Tu as Jeanne Silkingers
 The Karlins as Triplets
 Warren Mitchell as Popov
 Nora Nicholson as Anastasia Petrovna
 Bryan Pringle as Police Sergeant
 Leonard Rossiter as Inspector Dudley
 Bill Fraser as Bookseller
 David Horne as Duke of Windemere
 Charles Lloyd-Pack as Butler
 Anne Blake as Nashka
 Ian Trigger as Popov's assistant

References

External links

1968 films
1968 comedy films
1960s crime comedy films
British crime comedy films
1960s heist films
Films directed by Christopher Morahan
British heist films
Films produced by Carlo Ponti
ABC Motion Pictures films
Paramount Pictures films
Films set in London
Films with screenplays by Ronald Harwood
1960s English-language films
1960s British films